The Västergötlands Fotbollförbund (Västergötland Football Association) is one of the 24 district organisations of the Swedish Football Association. It administers lower tier football in the historical province of Västergötland.

Background 

Västergötlands Fotbollförbund, commonly referred to as Västergötlands FF, is the governing body for football in the historical province of Västergötland, which partly corresponds with the area now covered by Västra Götaland County. The Association was founded on 17 March 1918 and currently has 279 member clubs.  Based in Skövde, the Association's Chairman is Magnus Gunnarsson.

Affiliated Members 

The following clubs are affiliated to the Västergötlands FF:

Alingsås FK
Alingsås IF
Alingsås Internationella FF
Alingsås Kvinnliga IK
Alvhems IK
Ambjörnarps IF
Annelunds IF
Aplareds IF
Ardala GoIF
Arentorp Helås FK
Arentorps SK
Axvalls IF
Bergdalens IK
Björketorps IF
Björsäters IF
BK Spark
BK Trix
Bollebygds IF
Borås AIK
Borås GIF
Borås Kings Idrottsförening
Borgstena IF
Borgunda IK
Bosna FC
Brämhults IK
Bredareds IF
Byttorps FC
Byttorps IF
Dalsjöfors GoIF
Dalstorps IF
Dannike IK
Dardania IF
DIF Holmalund
DIK Friscopojkarna
Edsvära/N.Vånga FF
Ekedalens SK
Elmer-Fåglum FK
Essunga IS
Fagersanna IF
Fåglums IF
Falköping United FC
Falköpings DIK
Falköpings FK
Falköpings Kvinnliga IK
FC Corner
FC Gauthiod
FC Kabel Åttio
FC Lockryd
FC Södra Ryd
FC Trollhättan
FK Yugo
Floby IF
Folkabo IK
Forsviks IF
Främmestads IK
Fristads GoIF
Fritsla IF
Fröjereds IF
Futsal Club Tranan
Gällstads AIS
Gällstads FK
Gällstads IF
Gånghester SK
Gerdskens BK
Göta BK
Götene IF
Grimsås IF
Grolanda IF
Grönahögs IK
Gullspångs IF
Håcksviks IF
Hajoms IF
Håkantorps IS
Hällekis IF
Hällstads IF
Halvorstorps IS
Hangelösa IF
Härlunda IF
Hassle-Torsö GoIF
Håvens IF
Hedareds BK
Hemsjö IF
Herrljunga SK FK
Hestrafors IF
Hillareds IF
Hjärtums IS
Högvads BK
Holmalunds IF Alingsås
Hols IF
Holsljunga IF
Hörnebo FC
Hörnebo SK
Horreds IF
Hössna IF
Hova IF
Hudene GoIF
Hyssna IF
IF Elfsborg
IF Heimer
IF Knallen
IF Olsfors
IF Tymer
IF Weimer Lyrestad
IFK Emtunga
IFK Falköping FF
IFK Hjo
IFK Mariestad
IFK Örby
IFK Öxnevalla
IFK Skövde FK
IFK Tidaholm
IFK Trollhättan
IFK Värsås
Igelstorps IK
IK Elmer
IK Friscopojkarna
IK Gauthiod
Inlands IF
Järpås IS
Jula BK
Jung/Kvänum  IF
Kållandsö GoIF
Källby IF
Kindaholms FF
Kinna IF
Kinnahults IF
Kinnarp-Slutarps IF
Kinne-Vedums FK
Kinne-Vedums IF
Korsberga IF
Kronängs IF
Långareds BoIS
Länghems IF
Larvs FK
Lerdala IF
Levene/Skogslunds IF
Lidköpings IF
Lidköpings FK
Lidköping United
Lilla Edets IF
Limmareds IF
Ljungsarps IF
Lödöse Nygård IK
Lundsbrunns IF
Magra IS
Målsryds IF
Månstads IF
Marbäcks IF
Mariedals IK
Mariestads BK
Mariestads BoIS DFF
Mariestads BoIS FF
Mellby IK
Mjöbäcks GOIF
Moholms SK
Mölltorp/Breviks AIF
Mullsjö IF
Nittorps IK
Norra Fågelås IF
Norra Härene BK
Norrby Futsal Club
Norrby IF
Norrmalms IK
Nossebro IF
Ods FF
Pars IF
Rackeby IK
Rackeby KIK
Råda BK
Råda DBK
Rångedala IK
Redvägs FK
Roasjö IF
Rydals GIF
Rydboholms SK
Ryrs Allmänna IF
Saleby IF
Sandareds IF
Sandhems IF
Sandhults SK
Sätila SK
Sävens BK
Serbisk-Svensk KIF
Sexdrega IF
Sils DIF
Sils IF
Sjömarkens IF
Sjötofta IF
Sjuntorps IF
SK Mjörn
Skara FC
Skara IF
Skara Kvinnliga Idrottsklubb
Skarke KIK Varnhem
Skene IF
Skene IF 09
Skepplanda BTK
Skoftebyns DIF
Skoftebyns IF
Skogslunds IF
Skövde AIK
Skövde Kvinnliga IK
Skultorps IF
Södra Härene IF
Södra Vings IF
Sollebrunns AIK
Somali FF
Söne SK
Sparsörs AIK
Stenstorps IF
Stora Levene IK
Stora Mellby SK
Svenljunga IK
Svenska Suryoyo Föreningen
Team Ted Futsal Club
Tibro AIK FK
Tidaholms GoIF
Tidans IF
Tidavads IF
Tigris IF
Timmele GoIF
Töllsjö IF
Tomtens IF
Töreboda IK
Torestorp/Älekulla FF
Torestorps IF
Torsö Bygdegårds och IF
Trädets IF
Tranemo IF
Transcom FC Borås
Trässbergs BK
Tråvads IF
Trollhättans BoIS
Trollhättans FF
Trollhättans FK
Trollhättans IF
Trolmens SK
Tuns IK
Tvärred/Vegby FC
Tvärreds IF
Ubbhults IF
Uddebo GoIF
Ulricehamns IFK
Ulvåkers FC
Ulvåkers IF
Undenäs IF
Upphärads IS
Valtorps IF
Våmbs IF
Vänersborgs FK
Vänersborgs IF
Vänga BK
Vara SK
Vårgårda IK
Värings GoIF
Varnhems IF
Vartofta SK
Västerlanda GOIF
Vedums AIS
Vegby SK
Vilske-Kleva BK
Vinninga AIF
Viskafors IF
Vretens BK
Wargöns IK
Wästerhov IK
Åsaka SK
Åsarps IF
Åsarp-Trädet FK
Åsunden FK
Älekulla IF
Älgarås SK
Äspereds IF
Örby FC
Örslösa IF
Östadkulle SK
Östra Frölunda IF
Öxabäcks IF

League Competitions 
Västergötlands FF run the following League Competitions:

Men's Football
Division 4  -  three sections
Division 5  -  six sections
Division 6  -  six sections

Women's Football
Division 3  -  two sections
Division 4  -  three sections
Division 5  -  five sections

Footnotes

External links 
 Västergötlands FF Official Website 

Vastergotlands
Football in Västra Götaland County
Sports organizations established in 1918
1918 establishments in Sweden